Scott Richard Donie (born October 10, 1968, in Vicenza, Italy) is an American diver.  He earned the silver medal in the 1992 Summer Olympics on the 10 m platform, and placed 4th in the 3 m springboard at the 1996 Summer Olympics in Atlanta.

Donie has lived and trained in New Jersey and Texas.  He also lived and trained in Fort Lauderdale, Florida in 1992. He is a six-time Age Group National Diving Champion and a two-time National Senior Champion. He received a bachelor's degree from Southern Methodist University in 1990. Donie is an eleven-time Southwest Conference Diving Champion and a three-time National NCAA Division I Champion.
He was a member of the US National Diving team from 1985 through 1996.

Donie is currently the Head Diving Coach of Columbia University. He was the Head Diving Coach at New York University from 2000 to 2016. He has coached 18 All-Americans during his career at NYU.

References

External links
 
 

1968 births
Divers at the 1992 Summer Olympics
Divers at the 1996 Summer Olympics
Living people
Olympic silver medalists for the United States in diving
American male divers
Medalists at the 1992 Summer Olympics
Universiade medalists in diving
Universiade bronze medalists for the United States
Medalists at the 1991 Summer Universiade
Medalists at the 1993 Summer Universiade